Carmen Lee Solomons is a South African fashion model. She is best known as one of the faces of Fenty Beauty and Kylie Cosmetics.

Early life 
Solomons was born in the town of Kraaifontein just outside Cape Town. Before modelling, Solomons worked as a secretary at a medical office.

Career 
Solomons has modeled for Kanye West's Yeezy clothing line. She has also modeled for the Kendall + Kylie clothing line. She has appeared in music videos for recording artists Usher and Cardi B. She has also appeared in an Aerie campaign.

References 

South African female models
People from Cape Town
1991 births
Living people